Arthur Duncan Hussey (March 5, 1882 – April 3, 1915) was an American golfer who competed in the 1904 Summer Olympics. At the 1904 Olympics, Hussey was part of the American team which won the bronze medal.

References

External links
 Arthur Hussey's profile at Sports Reference.com

American male golfers
Amateur golfers
Golfers at the 1904 Summer Olympics
Olympic bronze medalists for the United States in golf
Medalists at the 1904 Summer Olympics
1882 births
1915 deaths